Jessica Dahiana Sánchez Cáceres (born 25 November 2000) is a Paraguayan footballer who plays as a forward for Brazilian Série A2 club Botafogo de Futebol e Regatas and the Paraguay women's national team.

International career
Sánchez represented Paraguay at the 2018 FIFA U-20 Women's World Cup. She made her senior debut on 4 October 2019 in a 1–1 friendly draw against Venezuela.

References

2000 births
Living people
Women's association football forwards
Paraguayan women's footballers
Paraguay women's international footballers
Club Olimpia footballers
Paraguayan expatriate women's footballers
Paraguayan expatriate sportspeople in Brazil
Expatriate women's footballers in Brazil
21st-century Paraguayan women